Hans-Jakob Mathisen (born 17 February 1937) is a Norwegian footballer. He played in five matches for the Norway national football team from 1959 to 1961.

References

External links
 

1937 births
Living people
Norwegian footballers
Norway international footballers
Place of birth missing (living people)
Association footballers not categorized by position